Michael or Mick Palmer may refer to:
 Michael Palmer (American football) (born 1988), American football tight end
 Michael Palmer (athlete) (born 1935), British Olympic athlete
 Michael Palmer (British Army officer) (1928–2017), British Defence Services Secretary
 Michael Palmer (Canadian football) (born 1980), wide receiver in the Canadian Football League
 Michael Palmer (conductor) (born 1945), American orchestral conductor
 Michael Palmer (musician) (born 1960), Jamaican reggae musician
 Michael Palmer (novelist) (1942–2013), American novelist and author of Extreme Measures
 Michael Palmer (philosopher) (born 1945), English philosopher
 Michael Palmer (poet) (born 1943), American poet and translator
 Michael Palmer (politician) (born 1968), former Singaporean politician
 Mick Palmer (police commissioner) (born 1941), former Australian Federal Police commissioner
 Mick Palmer (Australian politician) (born 1953), former Australian politician

See also
 Mike Palmer, American football player